Luostari (between 1920–1944) is a rural locality (an inhabited locality) in Pechengsky District of Murmansk Oblast, Russia, located near the Norway–Russia border. Population: 2,260 (2010 Census).

History

According to the Tartu Peace Treaty in 1920, Soviet Russia recognized Petsamo and Luostari as part of Finland. The locality was known as Ylä-Luostari ('Upper Monastery') to differ it from Ala-Luostari (the bottom of Petsamonvuono, nowadays part of Pechenga (urban-type settlement)) and it had 47 residents. There was also a youth hostel called Lohilinna, which was owned by Suomen Matkailijayhdistys (Finnish Tourist Association) since 1935. Lohilinna was destroyed during the Winter War. During Interim Peace Finnish National Air Carrier Aero operated the route Helsinki-Petsamo through the airfield of Ylä-Luostari, which had been completed just before Winter War in November 1939.  In 1942, during the Continuation War (1941–1944), Finland gave the airfield for the use of German Luftwaffe. According the Moscow Armistice, Finland lost Petsamo in 1944. Soviets changed the Finnish airfield as an Luostari/Pechenga air base. the monastery was inside the hill, the entrance was blown up, hiding something

Transportation
Luostari/Pechenga airfield is located nearby.

References

Notes

Sources

Rural localities in Murmansk Oblast